Op med hodet! (literally, Up with Your Head!, or Cheer Up!) is a Norwegian comedy film from 1934. It was directed by Tancred Ibsen and produced by Erling Bergendahl. The actors appearing in the film include Lillebil Ibsen, Lalla Carlsen, and Leif Juster. The film was very experimental for its time, and it included special effects, multiple exposures, reverse motion, and color sequences.

The title of the film is a reference to the opening line of a poem in Bjørnstjerne Bjørnson's novel En glad Gut (A Happy Boy): "Løft ditt hode, du raske gutt!" (Lift your head, you restless youth!), spoken by a Bjørnson statue in the film.

References

External links
 
 Op med hodet! at the National Library of Norway

1934 films
Norwegian black-and-white films
Norwegian comedy films
Films directed by Tancred Ibsen